Reinado Internacional del Café 2016 (International Coffee Queen) beauty pageant, was held in Manizales, Colombia, on January 9, 2016. At the end of the event, the outgoing queen Yuri Uchida, Reina Internacional del Café 2015 from Japan crowned Maydeliana Díaz from Venezuela as her successor.

Results

Special awards

Judges
 Vanessa Mendoza – Miss Colombia 2001
 Andrés Pajón – Fashion designer
 Natalia Robledo Luna – Editor of Jet Set Magazine

Contestants

Crossovers
Contestants who previously competed or will compete at other beauty pageants:

Miss Universe:
2014:  – Claudia Tavel 
2015:  – Paola Núñez
2019:  – Júlia Horta

Miss World:
2015:  – Gabriela Salazar
2016:  – María Laura Castillo
2019:  – Inês Brusselmans (TBA)

Miss Supranational:
2015:  – Inês Brusselmans

Miss Intercontinental:
2014:  – Jeslie Mergal (1st runner-up) (as )
2015:  – Lisbeth Valverde

Reina Hispanoamericana:
2013:  – Claudia Tavel (6th runner-up)

Miss United Continents:
2014:  – Gabriela Salazar

Miss America Latina del Mundo:
2015:  – Lisbeth Valverde (4th runner-up)
2015:  – Carla Vieira (Top 10)

Notes

Returns
Last competed in 2014:

Withdraws

References

External links
 Instituto de Cultura y Turismo de Manizales
 Alcaldía de Manizales
 Feria de Manizales

2016
2016 beauty pageants
2016 in Colombia
January 2016 events in South America